The Nāsadīya Sūkta (after the incipit , or "not the non-existent"), also known as the Hymn of Creation, is the 129th hymn of the 10th mandala of the Rigveda (10:129). It is concerned with cosmology and the origin of the universe.

Nasadiya Sukta begins with the statement: "Then, there was neither existence, nor non-existence." It ponders when, why, and through whom the universe came into being in a contemplative tone, and provides no definite answers. Rather, it concludes that the gods too may not know, as they came after creation, and that even the surveyor of that which has been created, in the highest heaven may or may not know. To this extent, the conventional English title Hymn of Creation is perhaps misleading, since the poem does not itself present a cosmogony or creation myth akin to those found in other religious texts, instead provoking the listener to question whether one can ever know the origins of the universe.

Interpretations

The hymn has attracted a large body of literature of commentaries both in Indian darsanas and in Western philology.
The hymn, as Mandala 10 in general, is late within the Rigveda Samhita, and expresses thought more typical of later Vedantic philosophy.
Even though untypical of the content of the Vedic hymns, it is one of the most widely received portions of the Rigveda.
An atheist interpretation sees the Creation Hymn as one of the earliest accounts of skeptical inquiry and agnosticism. Astronomer Carl Sagan quoted it in discussing India's "tradition of skeptical questioning and unselfconscious humility before the great cosmic mysteries."

The text begins by paradoxically stating "not the non-existent existed, nor did the existent exist then", paralleled  in verse 2 by "then not death existed, nor the immortal". But already in verse 2 mention is made that there was "breathing without breath, of its own nature, that one" ). In verse 3, being unfolds, "from heat (tapas) was born that one". Verse 4 mentions desire (kāma) as the primal seed, and the first poet-seers (kavayas) who "found the bond of being  within non-being with their heart's thought".

Karel Werner describes the author's source for the material as one not derived from reasoning, but a "visionary, mystical or Yogic experience put into words." Werner writes that prior to creation, the Creation Hymn does not describe a state of "nothingness" but rather "That One (tad ekam)" which is, "Spaceless, timeless, yet in its own way dynamic and the Sole Force, this Absolute..."

Brereton (1999) argues that the reference to the sages searching for being in their spirit is central, and that the hymn's gradual procession from non-being to being in fact re-enacts creation within the listener (see ), equating poetic utterance and creation (see śabda).

Metre
Nasadiya Sukta consists of seven trishtubhs, although para 7b is defective, being two syllables short,

"if he has created it; or if not [...]"
Brereton (1999) argues that the defect is a conscious device employed by the rishi to express puzzlement at the possibility that the world may not be created, parallel to the syntactic defect of pada 7d, which ends in a subordinate clause without a governing clause:

"he verily knows; or maybe he does not know [...]"

Text and  translation

See also

 Creation myth
 Creatio ex nihilo
 God in Hinduism
 Hindu cosmology
 Hiranyagarbha
 Indian logic
 List of suktas and stutis
 Narayana sukta
 Neti neti
 Purusha Sukta

Notes

Further reading
Joel P. Brereton, Edifying Puzzlement:  10. 129 and the Uses of Enigma, Journal of the American Oriental Society (1999)
P. T. Raju, The Development of Indian Thought, Journal of the History of Ideas  (1952)
Karel Werner, Symbolism in the Vedas and Its Conceptualisation,  Numen (1977)

Agnosticism
Creation myths
Rigveda
Vedic hymns
Hindu creation myths
Hindu cosmology